Oakland University (Oakland) is a public research university in  Rochester, Michigan.  Founded in 1957 through a donation of Matilda Dodge Wilson, it was initially known as Michigan State University-Oakland, operating under the Michigan State University Board of Trustees. The university gained institutional independence from the board in 1970 and was renamed Oakland University.

Oakland University is one of the eight research universities in the State of Michigan and is classified among "R2: Doctoral Universities – High research activity." The university offers 132 bachelor's degree programs and 138 professional graduate certificate, master's degree, and doctoral degree programs, including those offered by the Oakland University William Beaumont School of Medicine. It had a total enrollment of more than 20,000 students in 2016.

The university's site in Rochester comprises the Main Campus, Meadow Brook Estate, and two nationally ranked golf courses spread across 1,443 acres (5.84 km2). Meadow Brook Hall, a U.S. National Historic Landmark and the fourth-largest historic house museum in the United States, is located on the site.

Previously known as the Pioneers, Oakland's athletic teams were renamed the Grizzlies in 1998. They compete in the NCAA Division I Horizon League.

History

In 1920, Matilda inherited John's fortune upon his death, soon remarrying to a lumber baron, Alfred G. Wilson. Between 1926 and 1929, the couple built Meadow Brook Hall on the land.

Oakland University was created in 1957 when Matilda Dodge Wilson and her second husband, Alfred Wilson, donated their  estate to Michigan State University, including Meadow Brook Hall, Sunset Terrace and all the estate's other buildings and collections, along with $2 million.  Main campus buildings were completed on Squirrel Road in Pontiac Township (now the city of Auburn Hills). Originally known as Michigan State University–Oakland, the university enrolled its first students in 1959, was renamed Oakland University in 1963,  and has been officially independent of Michigan State University since 1970.

Wilson demanded that U.S. Postmaster General Arthur Summerfield let the university use a Rochester, Michigan, mailing address (201 Meadow Brook Rd., Rochester, Michigan 48309), even though the main campus was in Pontiac Township (now the city of Auburn Hills). After Wilson reminded him that she had contributed to his administration, Summerfield granted her request.

In September 2009, tenured faculty members represented by the Oakland University chapter of the American Association of University Professors went on strike. Issues of contention included the university claiming ownership of professors' copyrights and patents, refusing to allow faculty input into matters of class size and curricula, reduction of health benefits and a three-year salary freeze. The salary freeze was in contrast to university president Gary Russi, who had just received a $100,000 raise. The university's board of trustees maintained that the strike was illegal and filed a lawsuit against the Oakland AAUP. After a week's strike, the faculty and administration came to an agreement on a three-year contract, which was implemented.

During the 2012 Republican presidential primaries, Oakland University hosted a debate between Republican presidential candidates on 9 November 2011. CNBC televised the debate nationally, and the Michigan Republican Party co-sponsored the debate with CNBC. Eight candidates participated: Michele Bachmann, Herman Cain, Newt Gingrich, Jon Huntsman, Ron Paul, Rick Perry, Mitt Romney, and Rick Santorum.

In 2013, the Oakland University Board of Trustees approved a $65 million investment in campus expansion and improvement projects. Completed in the fall of 2014, projects included: construction of a nearly $30 million student housing complex; dramatic enhancement of outdoor recreation and athletic fields; construction of a 1,240-space parking structure, and; construction of new headquarters for facility and grounds maintenance operations. Longtime supporters of the university, Hugh and Nancy Elliott, made a donation to construct the Elliott Tower on the campus. The 151-foot carillon tower was completed in fall 2014 and houses the last bells to be cast by the Royal Bellfoundry Petit & Fritsen of the Netherlands.

For the fall 2013 semester, Oakland University had an enrollment of 20,169 students. Oakland University is the 12th largest college or university in Michigan, 8th largest of 4-year universities. (Based on 2012 enrollment of 19,740)

The board appointed George W. Hynd president of the university in July 2014. He replaced Dr. Gary Russi, who retired in August 2013.

On 4 May 2017, the board announced Ora Hirsch Pescovitz, M.D., as Oakland University's seventh president. Her tenure began on 1 July 2017, under a 5-year contract.

Academics

Admissions

Undergraduate 

Oakland University is considered "selective" by U.S. News & World Report. For the Class of 2025 (enrolled fall 2021), Oakland University received 10,475 applications and accepted 9,661 (92.2%). Of those accepted, 2,025 enrolled, a yield rate (the percentage of accepted students who choose to attend the university) of 21.0%. Oakland University's freshman retention rate is 73.1%, with 56% going on to graduate within six years.

The enrolled first-year class of 2025 had the following standardized test scores: the middle 50% range (25th percentile-75th percentile) of SAT scores was 990-1220, while the middle 50% range of ACT scores was 21-29.

Academic divisions

Oakland University offers 132 bachelor's degree programs and 138 graduate programs (professional certificates, master's degrees, and doctoral degrees). The main academic units of the university are the College of Arts and Sciences, the School of Business Administration, the School of Education and Human Services, the School of Engineering and Computer Science, the School of Health Sciences, School of Nursing, and the Oakland University William Beaumont School of Medicine. Additionally, Oakland University supports an Honors College and various study abroad programs. Its most popular undergraduate majors, by 2021 graduates, were:
Registered Nursing/Registered Nurse (458)
Health Professions and Related Clinical Sciences (285)
Psychology (161)
Mechanical Engineering (160)
Human Resources Development (149)
Communication (128)
Biology/Biological Sciences (124)
Elementary Education and Teaching (121)

In 2007, plans were established to start a medical school on the Oakland University campus in partnership with William Beaumont Hospital, called the Oakland University William Beaumont School of Medicine (OUWB or OUWBSM) came to fruition. The medical school was founded in 2008 with classes starting in fall of 2011. OUWB is the fourth medical school in the state of Michigan to offer the M.D. degree, received over 3,200 applications for the inaugural class of 50 students.  OUWBSM has 225 students as of Fall 2013 and 500 were planned for 2017. The founding dean of the medical school is Robert Folberg, M.D.

The Oakland University – Beaumont Nurse Anesthesia Graduate Program started in 1991. In 2011, U.S. News & World Report ranked the program tied for 17th in the United States.

Oakland University's School of Business Administration (SBA) is accredited by the AACSB-International accreditation in both business and accounting. It also offers Michigan's only Executive MBA program with concentrations in Health Care and IS Leadership. In 2009, the SBA celebrated its 40th anniversary.

Research centers and institutes
As part of its research mission, Oakland University also supports a number of major research centers and institutes, including the Center for Biomedical Research, the Center for Robotics and Advanced Automation, the Fastening and Joining Research Institute, the Human Systems Initiative, and the renowned Eye Research Institute. Furthermore, Oakland University's Smart Zone Business Incubator provides entrepreneurial resources and expertise to support and foster new technology-based and life science businesses.

Some Oakland University Research Centers and Institutes include:
 Center for Applied Research in Musical Understanding
 Center for Biomedical Research
 Center for Creative and Collaborative Computing
 Center for Integrated Business Research and Education
 Center for Public Humanities
 Center for Robotics and Advanced Automation
 Eye Research Institute
 Fastening and Joining Research Institute
 Lowry Center for Early Childhood Education
 Nanotech Research & Development Institute
 Oakland University Center for Autism Research, Education and Support (OUCARES)
 Pawley Learning Institute
 Product Development and Manufacturing Center
 Public Affairs Research Laboratory

Campus

In addition to its location in the cities of Auburn Hills and Rochester Hills, Oakland University maintains an official "hometown" relationship with the nearby but not adjacent city of Rochester, Michigan. University and city officials signed a partnership agreement in 2003 to officially recognize the relationship between Rochester and Oakland University. In 1959, Rochester Village (now city) officials renamed the  Fifth Street in downtown Rochester "University Drive" to showcase Rochester as a "college town". The road is called Walton Boulevard adjacent to the University in Rochester Hills and Auburn Hills. This is often confused with University Drive in Auburn Hills, which originates at Oakland University's main entrance in Auburn Hills, and continues west into downtown Pontiac. In 2005, the Rochester area was ranked 39th in the CNN/Money Magazine list of the Top 100 American cities in which to live.

Oakland University's campus, which encompasses , includes trails and biking paths and two nationally ranked golf courses.

Oakland County
The university's land in Auburn Hills and Rochester Hills is divided into the Main Campus, Meadow Brook Estate, and two golf courses.

Main Campus
Meadow Brook Theatre, which was founded in 1967, is the largest non-profit professional theater in Michigan, and presents a wide variety of award-winning productions throughout the year. Additionally, the Oakland University Art Gallery, which was formerly known as the Meadow Brook Art Gallery, presents at least six different exhibitions each academic year, in addition to hosting a variety of lectures, performances and symposia.

Kresge Library is the main library of Oakland University. It consists of four floors of study rooms and open-area tables. It also contains the Oakland University Archives, the Historical Abraham Lincoln Collection, the Jane M. Bingham Historical Children's Collection, and a tech center. The library is named after Stanley and Sebastian Kresge who were both present for the library's opening in 1962.

In 2009, an 18-hole disc golf course opened. Grizzly Oaks was co-designed by student Jarrett Schlaff and licensed by the Professional Disc Golf Association.

Oakland University's student union, the Oakland Center, was renovated and expanded in 2018.  The Oakland Center houses the offices of student organizations, a large food court with multiple restaurants, the student bookstore, a cafe, a pool hall and gaming center, a Student Technology Center, the campus newspaper The Oakland Post, computer labs, conference rooms, as well as the offices of the university radio station, WXOU (88.3 FM).  Oakland University also has its own television station (OU TV) which is broadcast on-campus and to the local community.

The campus has recreational facilities for intramural sports and for Oakland University's 16 NCAA Division I athletic teams, including the lighted Upper Athletic Fields, the indoor Sports Dome, fields for varsity baseball, softball, and soccer, and facilities for basketball, handball, track, and weight training. The campus recreation center houses Oakland University's natatorium, and the Athletics Center O'rena, a 4,000-seat field house, is the home court for Oakland University basketball and volleyball.

Near the center of campus is the Elliot Tower (above). This clock tower was finished in 2014 after many delays to its construction that began toward the end of 1945 just after the end of WWII, making it both the oldest and one of the newest structures simultaneously at Oakland University.

Meadow Brook Estate
This portion of Oakland University consists of the historic Meadow Brook Hall and the land and buildings surrounding it. The hall, which is a 110-room Tudor revival–style mansion completed in 1929 as Oakland University founder Matilda Dodge Wilson's Oakland County estate, is listed on the National Register of Historic Places.  Meadow Brook Hall is the fourth-largest historic house museum in the United States, and houses a vast collection of historically significant art and furniture, including paintings by Rembrandt, Anthony van Dyck, Rosa Bonheur, Gilbert Stuart, Joshua Reynolds, John Constable, and Thomas Gainsborough, as well as sculptures by Antoine-Louis Barye, Frederic Remington, Cyrus Edwin Dallin, and Herbert Haseltine. Meadow Brook Hall is frequently utilized as a site for select university functions, including the Meadow Brook Ball, a popular student event. Until 2010, Meadow Brook Hall and its grounds were the site of the annual Meadow Brook Concours d'Elegance, one of the largest collector car shows in the world.

The Meadow Brook Music Festival is an outdoor entertainment venue with an on-site pavilion which accommodates close to 8,000 people. In addition to being the site of spring-time graduation ceremonies, Meadow Brook Music Festival also hosts comedians and musical acts. Meadow Brook Music Festival is managed by Palace Sports and Entertainment.

Golf courses
Oakland University has two nationally ranked golf courses that make up most of the southern portion of its land. Some of the course's 18 holes remain from the 9-hole course John Dodge built when he lived at the estate. The other course, opened in 2000, is the R & S Sharf course.

Macomb County
An office plaza in downtown Mount Clemens, in Macomb County, was donated to the university in 2010 by Gebran Anton and Stuart Frankel. It was repurposed and opened for the fall 2011 semester as the Anton/Frankel Center. It offers several undergraduate and graduate programs.

Oakland University is also among the 12 colleges and universities offering programs at Macomb Community College's University Center.

Oakland University Art Gallery, and art collection
The Oakland University Art Gallery is a civic art exhibition venue in Rochester Hills, Michigan. Founded in 1966, it is part of Oakland University and occupies a portion of the University’s Wilson Hall. The gallery’s exhibitions have garnered national and international attention, and have been reviewed in publications including Art in America, Sculpture and W Magazine.

Art collection
The collection has over 1,500 art objects. The gallery collection includes twentieth and twenty-first century paintings and sculptures by artists Richard Artschwager, Fernando Botero, Alex Katz, Malcolm Morley, Carlos Rolón, and Terry Winters.

Other contemporary artworks in the collection include Detroit artists Michael Luchs, Gordon Newton, Robert Sestok, and Gilda Snowden.

Former Professor of Art History and Archeology Carl F. Barnes Jr., and Anna M. Barnes donated their collection of over 500 prints in 1999. Collections highlights include the print oeuvre of English print maker and portrait painter Gerald Brockhurst. Other artist highlights from this collection include William Blake, Eugène Delacroix, Albrecht Dürer, William Hogarth, John Sloan, and James Abbott McNeill Whistler.

The Tagore Collection was donated by Dr. Abanindranath Tagore in 1989. It contains calligraphy, rubbings, and scrolls. Among the scrolls, include works by Qi Baishi, Xu Beihong, Zhang Daqian, Li Keran, and Qigong, among others.

G. Mennen Williams, the 41st Governor of Michigan, donated his collection in to the gallery in 1968. Williams held the position of Assistant Secretary of State for African Affairs during the Kennedy administration and bequeathed objects acquired during his tours of duty. A majority of the objects originate from West Africa in what is now Nigeria, Mali, Côte d'Ivoire, Burkino Faso, Ghana and Benin.

Exhibitions and programming
The Oakland University Art Gallery hosts at least five exhibitions per year, in addition to hosting a variety of lectures, performances, and symposium. Although the gallery published catalogues for select exhibitions throughout its history, since 1999 each exhibition has had an accompanying catalogue.

Operations
Oakland University Art Gallery is wholly part of Oakland University. Its exhibitions and operations are funded through a variety of university, foundation, and individual contributions.

The gallery is open to the public. There is no general admission fee or special charge for exhibitions.

Athletics

"OU Fight" is the Oakland University fight song. Previously known as the Pioneers, the school's teams were renamed the Golden Grizzlies in 1998.

Oakland University was used as a training camp for the Detroit Lions in 1989.

Oakland University's men's soccer team became the first Oakland team to move past the first round of their sport's respective NCAA tournament in 2007.

Student life
Although many of Oakland's students commute from surrounding areas, there are more than 3,000 who live on campus in a variety of residence halls and student apartments. The residence halls include Hillcrest Hall, Oak View Hall, Hamlin Hall, Vandenberg Hall, Hill House, Van Wagoner House, and Fitzgerald House. Residential learning communities on Oakland University's campus include Scholars Tower and the Residential Honors College community. Eight additional buildings make up the George T. Matthews student apartments, and six major Tudor-style buildings house the Ann V. Nicholson student apartments, which were completed in 2002.

Campus life is enhanced by more than 200 registered student organizations, ranging from cultural and religious groups to Greek organizations.  Fraternities at Oakland University include Theta Chi, Sigma Pi, Tau Kappa Epsilon, Alpha Phi Alpha, Alpha Sigma Phi, Phi Mu Alpha Sinfonia, and Iota Phi Theta. Sororities include Alpha Delta Pi, Alpha Sigma Tau, Gamma Phi Beta, Phi Sigma Sigma, Sigma Alpha Iota, Sigma Sigma Sigma, Alpha Kappa Alpha, Delta Sigma Theta, Zeta Phi Beta, and Sigma Gamma Rho. The so-called Cottage District of campus, which consists of homes originally built for workers employed at the old Meadow Brook Estate, now contain fraternity and sorority houses. Additionally, the university owns an adjoining tract of land to the east of the main university campus, which was developed into a neighborhood in which many faculty members currently live.

Alumni

Arts and entertainment
 Curtis Armstrong – film and TV actor
 Regina Carter – jazz violinist, winner of MacArthur Fellowship
 Robert Englund – film and TV actor (attended)
 David Hasselhoff – actor (attended)
 Jayne Houdyshell – Broadway actress, Tony Award winner
 Hank Jones – jazz pianist and composer (honorary doctorate)
 Karen Newman – singer and actress
 Elizabeth Reaser – film and TV actress (attended)
 Doris Eaton Travis – dancer and actress (honorary doctorate)

Law
 Deborah Servitto – Judge, Michigan Court of Appeals

Government and politics
 Fran Amos – State Representative, Michigan House of Representatives
 Deborah Cherry – Senator, Michigan Senate
 APJ Abdul Kalam – India's 11th President (honorary doctorate)
 David J. Doyle – Michigan politician
 Renee Ellmers – Member of Congress from North Carolina
 Gordon R. England – former Secretary of the Navy (honorary doctorate)
 Ruth Johnson – Michigan politician
 Nancy Lenoil – State Archivist of California
 Carl Levin – U.S. Senator (honorary doctorate)
 Michael W. Michalak – United States Ambassador to Vietnam
 Adolph Mongo – political consultant (attended)
 G. Mennen Williams – former Governor of Michigan (honorary doctorate)
 Gary Yourofsky – animal rights activist

Business
 Howard Birndorf – co-founder, Hybritech
 John G. Denison – CEO of ATA Airlines
 N.R. Narayana Murthy – founder, CEO, and Ex Chairman, Infosys Limited (honorary doctorate)
 Maximiliano Larroquette – designer of Chevrolet Volt
 James E. Schrager – Professor, Graduate School of Business, University of Chicago

Education
 Janet L. Holmgren (BA, Oakland; PhD, Princeton) – President, Mills College
 James E. Schrager (BA, Oakland; PhD, Chicago) – Professor, Business, University of Chicago
 Richard T. Sullivan (BA, Oakland; PhD, Harvard) – Associate Professor, History, University of Notre Dame
 Steven D. Townsend (BS, Oakland; PhD, Vanderbilt) – Assistant Professor, Chemistry, Vanderbilt University
 Thomas J. Volgy (BA, Oakland; PhD, Minnesota) – Professor, Political Science, University of Arizona

Sports and media
 Keith Benson – NBA player
 Mike Brosseau – MLB infielder, Tampa Bay Rays
 Kay Felder – NBA player
 Andrew Good – former MLB pitcher, Arizona Diamondbacks, Detroit Tigers
 Brian Gregory – men's head basketball coach, Georgia Tech
 Seb Harris – professional footballer for Northampton Town
 Mike Helms – professional basketball player
 Don Kirkwood – former MLB pitcher, California Angels, Chicago White Sox, Toronto Blue Jays (attended)
 Rawle Marshall – former NBA player, Dallas Mavericks, Indiana Pacers
 Jasna Rather – four-time Olympian, degree in political science
 Tom Stanton – author and journalist
 Brian Stuard – professional golfer
 Jennifer Valoppi – TV journalist
 Kelly Williams – professional basketball player
 Gbemi Olateru-Olagbegi – professional radio personality, Lagos, Nigeria 
 Kendrick Nunn - NBA Player

Notes

References

External links

Oakland Athletics website

 
Public universities and colleges in Michigan
Universities and colleges in Oakland County, Michigan
Educational institutions established in 1957
1957 establishments in Michigan